

Belgium
 Belgian Congo – Henri Cornelis, Governor-General of Belgian Congo (1958–1960)

France
 French Somaliland – Jacques Marie Julien Compain, Governor of French Somaliland (1958–1962)

Portugal
 Angola – Horácio José de Sá Viana Rebelo, High Commissioner of Angola (1956–1960)

United Kingdom
 Aden – Sir William Henry Tucker Luce, Governor of Aden (1956–1960)
 Malta Colony – 
 Sir Robert Laycock, Governor of Malta (1954–1959)
 Sir Guy Grantham, Governor of Malta (1959–1962)
 Northern Rhodesia –  
 Sir Arthur Benson, Governor of Northern Rhodesia (1954–1959)
 Sir Evelyn Dennison Hone, Governor of Northern Rhodesia (1959–1964)

Colonial governors
Colonial governors
1959